The 2012 Open GDF Suez de Biarritz was a professional tennis tournament played on outdoor clay courts. It was the 10th edition of the tournament and was part of the 2012 ITF Women's Circuit. It took place in Biarritz, France between 9 and 15 July 2012. The singles championship was won by Romina Oprandi and the doubles championship was won by Séverine Beltrame and Laura Thorpe.

WTA entrants

Seeds

 Rankings are as of June 25, 2012.

Other entrants
The following players received wildcards into the singles main draw:
  Kristina Mladenovic

The following players received entry from the qualifying draw:
  Ulrikke Eikeri
  Mervana Jugić-Salkić
  Patrycja Sanduska
  Sofia Shapatava

The following players received entry through a Lucky loser spot:
  Angelina Gabueva
  Amandine Hesse

Champions

Singles

 Romina Oprandi def.  Mandy Minella, 7–5, 7–5

Doubles

 Séverine Beltrame /  Laura Thorpe def.  Lara Arruabarrena Vecino /  Monica Puig, 6–2, 6–3

External links
Official website
ITF website

Notes

Open GDF Suez de Biarritz
2012 in French tennis
Open de Biarritz